Martyrs' Memorial is a memorial and museum in Amman, Jordan.

Located next to the Amman Sport city, the museum was established in 1977 upon King Hussein's wishes. The museum showcases a rare collection of Jordan's military weapons, clothing and vehicles. It also serves as a memorial to the martyrs who gave their lives in the service of Jordan as early as 1915, starting with the Great Arab Revolution which was led by King Hussein's grandfather Hussein bin Ali.

Building 
The design and implementation of the building was accomplished with Jordanian expertise and skills Royal Engineering Corps in cooperation with local companies.

The front yard: welcomes visitors and surrounded by trees. It displays military vehicles, cannons and weapons that participated in the battles Which the Jordanian army fought in defense of Palestine and the causes of the Arab nation.

Back yard: In the back yard of the edifice is a Hawker Hunter warplane belonging to the Royal Jordanian Air Force that participated in the Battle of Samu in 1966. It was led, at the time, by Pilot Captain Ihsan Shardam and shot down two Israeli fighter planes. . The pentagonal shape attracts the attention of visitors. It adorns the upper part of its outer walls. She wrote with gold water glorifying the martyrs and urging martyrdom for the sake of God and the homeland.

References

 
Museums established in 1977
Museums in Amman